William Ernest Gibbons (24 April 1898 – 15 August 1976) was a British Conservative Party politician. He won the Bilston constituency at a by-election in 1944, but was defeated nine months later at the 1945 general election by Will Nally in the national Labour landslide of that year.

See also
List of United Kingdom MPs with the shortest service
UK by-election records

References

1898 births
1976 deaths
Conservative Party (UK) MPs for English constituencies
UK MPs 1935–1945